James Henry DeCoursey Jr. (July 7, 1932  October 17, 2016) was an American politician. He was the 36th Lieutenant Governor of Kansas from 1969 to 1971. DeCoursey was an alumnus of the University of Kansas and University of Notre Dame and holds Bachelor of Laws and Bachelor of Science (Finance) degrees. He died in 2016 at the age of 84.

References

 

2016 deaths
Kansas Democrats
1932 births
Lieutenant Governors of Kansas
Politicians from Kansas City, Kansas
University of Kansas alumni
University of Notre Dame alumni